William Hickey (30 June 1749 – 31 May 1830) was an English lawyer, but is best known for his vast Memoirs, composed in 1808–10 and published between 1913 and 1925, which in their manuscript form cover seven hundred and forty closely written pages. Described by Peter Quennell as "One of the most remarkable books of its kind ever published in the English Language", Hickey's Memoirs give an extraordinarily vivid picture of life in late 18th-century London, Calcutta, Madras and Jamaica which stands comparison with the best of his near-contemporary James Boswell.

Early life 1749–1769

Hickey was born in St. Albans Street, Pall Mall, Westminster, England, on 30 June 1749, the seventh son of Joseph Hickey, a successful Irish solicitor, and Mary Boulton, from a Yorkshire gentry family. He began his education at Westminster School, but was removed "in high disgrace" in December 1763 after neglecting his studies, frequenting public houses and leading, in his own words, a life of "idleness and dissipation". He was sent to a private school at Streatham in Surrey, where he was able to study Arithmetic, Writing, French, Drawing and Dancing in addition to the Classical Studies which had failed to engage him at Westminster. 

In January 1766, he left school and began his legal training, but he continued to lead an extremely debauched existence. Eventually he embezzled £500 from the accounts in his father's office, and when this was discovered it was resolved to send the prodigal to India to see if he could make good. Accordingly, Hickey embarked on the ship Plassey, a fast Indiaman, at Dungeness on 4 January 1769.

India and Jamaica

Upon arriving in India, Hickey was expected to join the British East India Company army as an officer cadet, but he was put off the prospect when he learned that the pay was "too contemptible to afford the common necessaries of life". He got back on the Plassey to return to England. The ship travelled on first to China, of which he gives an account in his memoirs. His father was less than pleased at his return. After Hickey reverted to his old ways, his father sent him to Jamaica to take up as a lawyer, with a warning that if he failed he could expect no further help — indeed, his father would no longer even receive him. Once in Jamaica he found that, because of limits imposed on the numbers of attorneys allowed to practice, he would not be able to make a living as a lawyer there. He returned to England, "with considerable regret", leaving about five months after his arrival, on 17 April 1776, arriving back on 14 June.

Through his various connections, including Edmund Burke, he arranged to be accepted as a lawyer in Bengal, a feat which restored his father's goodwill towards him. He departed for Bengal from Portsmouth on 1 May 1777 and called in, en route, at Cape Town. On 12 November 1777 Hickey, aged 28, was "entered on the Roll" as "Solicitor, Attorney, and Proctor of the Supreme Court" in Bengal. He prospered in those roles. In April 1779 he set out to return to England, charged by the English inhabitants of Calcutta to deliver, at their expense, a petition to Parliament in England that they should be entitled to trial by jury. After a difficult journey travelling via Cape Town and Holland he arrived back in England, at the port of Harwich, on 28 June 1780.

In October he first met and later took up with a demi-mondaine, Charlotte Barry, who was then aged 18 and with whom he fell in love. He offered to marry her; she refused marriage, but agreed to live with him as his partner. The couple then travelled together to India when Hickey was 32 in 1783. Charlotte did not survive long, dying on Christmas Day 1783, aged 21.

Hickey established himself in the legal profession, managing to obtain a series of lucrative posts, including Under-Sheriff and Clerk to the Chief Justice. Some while after Charlotte's death he took an Indian mistress, Jemdanee, who was locally considered to be his wife. She bore him a son in 1796, but died in childbirth. The couple's son died a few months after her.

Retirement
Hickey retired to the Buckinghamshire town of Beaconsfield in late 1808, having left India after becoming ill. He brought with him "a pair of elderly unmarried sisters, his favourite Indian servant Munnoo and a large parti-coloured English dog." The dullness of what he called a "trifling" place "with a very limited society", encouraged him to occupy his mind by writing his memoirs, which eventually extended to over 700 pages of handwritten text taking his life up to 1810, at which point he stopped.

The details of his life after 1810 are sketchy, but he seems to have moved to London with his sisters, Sarah and Ann, who died in 1824 and 1826 respectively. He died in 1830.

References

Editions

 Alfred Spencer (Ed.) The Memoirs of William Hickey (London: Hurst & Blackett) 1913–25, 4 Vols.
 Peter Quennell (Ed.) The Memoirs of William Hickey (London: Hutchinson) 1960
 Roger Hudson (Ed.) Memoirs of a Georgian Rake (London: The Folio Society) 1995
The later editions restore some coarser material that was omitted from the first publication.

1749 births
1830 deaths
English autobiographers
English lawyers
English people of Irish descent
History of Kolkata